Bethan Mary Wright (born 30 January 1996) is an English actress and model. She is known for portraying the roles of Chloe in the CBBC series Dixi and Danielle Clark in the Disney Channel musical drama The Lodge.

Early life and education
Wright was born in Northampton on 30 January 1996. At the age of four, she started taking ballet and tap classes and took part in various talent shows. She attended Spratton Hall School nearby and then Sylvia Young Theatre School in London.

Career
Wright's career began in modeling, featuring in adverts for companies such as Clarks, Canon, and Philadelphia. She was also featured in a marketing campaign for Marks & Spencer. She later became the face of Pretty Polly's sleepwear and lingerie collection.

Wright made her television debut in Dixi, playing the main role of Chloe from 2014 to 2016. She later had minor roles in two films, Breakdown and Between Two Worlds. In 2016, Wright was cast in the Disney Channel musical drama The Lodge as Danielle Clark. From 2019 to 2020, Wright had a recurring voice role in the Disney Channel cartoon 101 Dalmatian Street, voicing the role of Prunella Pug.

Filmography

References

External links 
 

1996 births
21st-century English actresses
Actors from Northamptonshire
Alumni of the Sylvia Young Theatre School
British expatriate actresses in the United States
English expatriates in the United States
English film actresses 
English television actresses
Living people 
People from Northampton